Founded in 1888, Messiniakos Gymnastic Club is one of the oldest athletic club in Greece with Panagiotis Benakis its first president. Messiniakos' traditional colours are green and white and in 1924 adopted as symbol a platanus foil.

Messiniakos has made a name of itself in many sports (football, volleyball, athletics, weight-lifting etc.) and has produced very good athletes, such as OFI's Brazilian footballer Davidson and Louis Tsatoumas in track and field, who is one of the biggest hopes for Greek athletics. The club used to be home to the Papaflessia international athletics meeting. The volleyball team had excellent appearances in the First Division, but is not participating at the current time.

Football team
The football team participated in the Second Division in the 2006-07 season. Its president is international businessman Stavros Papadopoulos. Papadopoulos is the former owner of Kalamata and Apollon Kalamaria. He bought both those teams when they were in the Third Division and Second Division, respectively, and invested substantial money into those teams and eventually took both those teams up to the first division.

Papadopoulos has shown he has the same plan for Messiniakos. He bought the team a few years back when it was just a local team, not even in Fourth Division. He has invested money into the team and brought in talented young players. During this time the team has achieved promotion from a non-league team all the way up to the second division, but has been relegated to the Third Division for the upcoming season after finishing in second last place in 2007.

The next years the football team weakened and now it plays in Messenia local League.

Volleyball team
The volleyball women's team of Messiniakos plays in A2 Ethniki (2015-16). The women's team has played one time in A1 Ethniki, in 1984-85 season. The men's volleyball has also played in A1 Ethniki Volleyball during 1985-88 period.

References

External links
 Official page

1888 establishments in Greece
Sport in Kalamata
Football clubs in Peloponnese (region)
Association football clubs established in 1888